Talkhari or Tall Khari may refer to:
Talkhari-ye Abbas-e Deligerdu
Talkhari-ye Bandar-e Deligerdu
Talkhari-ye Dam-e Deligerdu